Jatakam (also spelt Jathakam) is a 1953 Indian Tamil-language comedy film directed by R. Nagendra Rao. The film stars T. K. Balachandran and Suryakala. It was simultaneously made in Kannada as Jataka Phala and in Telugu as Jatakaphalam.

Cast 
List adapted from the film's song book

Male cast
 K. Sarangapani as Kandasami Kalingarayar
 R. Nagendra Rao as Chinnisami Thanjarayar
 T. K. Balachandran as Kanakasabai
 P. D. Sambandam as Somu
 Vikatan Krishnamoorthi as Dharmalingam
 N. S. Narayana Pillai as Doctor
 Ganapathi Bhat as Velu
Support Cast
S. G. Subbaiah, Kalyanam, C. V. Ramachandran

Female cast
 K. R. Chellam as Kannammal
 K. N. Kamalam as Vetummal
 Kamala Bai as Ponnammal
 K. Suryakala as Lakshmi
 Kumari Lakshmi as Saraswathi
 K. S. Angamuthu as Meena
Dance
 Kumari Kamala

Production 
The film was simultaneously made in Kannada as Jataka Phala and in Telugu as Jatakaphalam. The film was produced and directed by R. Nagendra Rao. Screenplay and dialogues were written by T. M. V. Pathi. Yoosuf Mulji was in charge of cinematography while the editing was done by S. Surya. Art direction was by A. Balu. Vazhuvoor B. Ramaiyah Pillai and Jaishankar handled the choreography. The film was processed at AVM laboratory.

Soundtrack 
Music was composed by R. Govardhanam while the lyrics were penned by T. K. Sundara Vathiyar. P. B. Sreenivas was introduced to Tamil films with the song Sindhanai En Selvame.

References

External links 

1950s multilingual films
1950s Tamil-language films
1953 comedy films
1953 films
Indian black-and-white films
Indian comedy films
Indian multilingual films